Pseudoeurycea gadovii, commonly known as Gadow's false brook salamander or Gadow's salamander, is a species of salamander in the family Plethodontidae. It is endemic to Mexico and occurs on and near the volcanoes Pico de Orizaba and Cofre de Perote in central region of Veracruz as well as on the slopes of La Malinche on the Tlaxcala-Puebla border.

Its natural habitats are pine-oak forests and bunchgrass above the treeline. It is a terrestrial species typically found hidden in burrows or under rotten logs or big rocks. It is threatened by habitat loss caused by logging, especially at lower elevations. All the volcanoes it is known from host national parks.

References

gadovii
Endemic amphibians of Mexico
Fauna of the Trans-Mexican Volcanic Belt
Amphibians described in 1926
Taxa named by Emmett Reid Dunn
Taxonomy articles created by Polbot